Octavian Vintilă (born 22 June 1938) is a Romanian fencer. He competed at the 1964 and 1972 Summer Olympics.

References

External links
 

1938 births
Living people
Romanian male sabre fencers
Olympic fencers of Romania
Fencers at the 1964 Summer Olympics
Fencers at the 1972 Summer Olympics